Dogg or The Dogg, is a stage name or ring name which may refer to:

 The Dogg (born 1983), Namibian musician
 Tha Dogg Pound, American hip hop group
 Nate Dogg (1969–2011), American rapper and R&B artist
 Red Dogg, a member of the hip hop group C-Block
 Road Dogg, American professional wrestler
 Snoop Dogg (born 1971), American rapper
 Swamp Dogg (born 1942), American soul artist

See also 
 Dawg (disambiguation)